Unorganized North Cochrane District is an unorganized area in the District of Cochrane in Northeastern Ontario, Canada. It comprises all parts of the district north of Timmins and Iroquois Falls which are not part of an incorporated municipality.

Communities
The territory includes the communities of Abitibi Canyon, Brower, Calstock, Coppell, Departure Lake, Driftwood, Eades, Fontaine's Landing, Fraserdale, Frederick, Gardiner, Ghost River, Hallebourg, Hunta, Jogues, Kitigan, Lac-Sainte-Thérèse, Low Bush River, Marina Veilleux, Mead, Moose Factory (partial), Norembega, Pagwa River, Smoky Falls and Tunis.

Demographics

Population trend:
 Population in 2011: 3064
 Population in 2006: 2447
 Population in 2001: 3237
 Population in 1996: 4187 (or 3702 when adjusted to 2001 boundaries)
 Population in 1991: 4020

Mother tongue:
 English as first language: 32.2%
 French as first language: 64.3%
 English and French as first language: 0.8%
 Other as first language: 2.7%

See also
List of townships in Ontario
List of francophone communities in Ontario

References

Geography of Cochrane District
Cochrane North